The Bayside Bulletin was a newspaper published in Cleveland, Redland City, Queensland, Australia.

History
The first issue was published on 28 August 1984, after which it was published weekly on Tuesday until the final issue on 24 June 2014. It was published by Redland Publishers.

On 2 July 2014, it merged with the Redland Times to form the Redland City Bulletin.

References

Defunct newspapers published in Queensland
Cleveland, Queensland